William Kearney (18 September 1895 – December 1986) was an English professional football outside forward who played in the Football League for Brentford.

Career 
A full back, Kearney began his career with hometown non-league club Sunderland Celtic. He was one of a number of players from the northeast to move to Brentford during the club's early seasons in the Football League. Kearney made six Third Division appearances deputising for full back Jimmy Hodson during the 1920–21 season, after which he was released.

Career statistics

References

1895 births
English footballers
English Football League players
Brentford F.C. players
1986 deaths
Footballers from Sunderland
Association football fullbacks